Brūno (also: Bruno) Haralds Kalniņš (7 May 1899, in Tukums, Courland Governorate of the Russian Empire, now Latvia  26 March 1990, in Stockholm, Sweden) was a Latvian social democratic politician and historian. He was the son of prominent social-democratic politicians Pauls Kalniņš and Klāra Kalniņa.

Political career 

Kalniņš was one of the leading figures of the social-democratic youth movement in interwar Latvia, and an elected member of the Saeima. As a key social-democratic activist, he was arrested and exiled to Sweden as a result of the authoritarian coup d'état by Kārlis Ulmanis in 1934.

Kalniņš returned to Latvia in 1940 following the Soviet occupation, initially serving as a political officer of the Latvian Army (then renamed as the Latvian People's Army) in the run-up to the armed forces' full incorporation into the Red Army. Later he became a lecturer in Marxist politics at the University of Latvia. During the occupation of Latvia by Nazi Germany, Kalniņš was arrested and sent to a Nazi concentration camp, but released in 1944.

After World War II he lived in Sweden, where he wrote several books on Baltic and Russian history and helped re-form the Latvian Social Democratic Workers' Party in exile. Although his later writings were critical of the Soviet régime in his homeland, many Latvians could not forgive him for his collaboration with the Soviets in 1940–41.

References 

1899 births
1990 deaths
People from Tukums
People from Courland Governorate
Latvian Social Democratic Workers' Party politicians
Deputies of the Constitutional Assembly of Latvia
Deputies of the 1st Saeima
Deputies of the 2nd Saeima
Deputies of the 3rd Saeima
Deputies of the 4th Saeima
Members of the Executive of the Labour and Socialist International
20th-century Swedish historians
Academic staff of the University of Latvia
Latvian military personnel of the Latvian War of Independence
Soviet Army officers
Latvian World War II refugees
Latvian emigrants to Sweden